Buckingham County is a rural United States county located in the Commonwealth of Virginia, and containing the geographic center of the state.  Buckingham County is part of the Piedmont region of Virginia, and the county seat is Buckingham.

Buckingham County was created in 1761 from the southeastern portion of Albemarle County and was predominantly farmland.  The county was probably named in honor of the Duke of Buckingham, though the precise origin is uncertain.  Several changes were made to the borders, until the existing boundaries were established in 1860.

As of the 2020 census, the county population was 16,824. Buckingham is part of the Charlottesville Metropolitan Statistical Area.

History 
Buckingham County, lying south of the James River and in the Piedmont at the geographic center of the state, was established on May 1, 1761 from the southeastern portion of Albemarle County. The origin of the county name probably comes from the Duke of Buckingham (Buckinghamshire, England). Some sources say that the county was named for Archibald Cary's estate "Buckingham," which was located on Willis Creek. This is the only Buckingham County in the United States.

In 1778 a small triangular area bordering the James River was given to Cumberland County. In 1845, another part was taken from Buckingham to form the northern portion of Appomattox County. A final adjustment of the Appomattox-Buckingham county line was made in 1860, and Buckingham's borders then became fixed in their current form. A fire destroyed the courthouse (designed by Thomas Jefferson) in 1869, and most of the early records of this county were lost.

In the nineteenth century the county was settled more heavily by people migrating from the Tidewater area. It was devoted chiefly to plantations, worked by enslaved African Americans. These were converted from tobacco cultivation to mixed farming and pulpwood harvesting as the markets changed and the soil became exhausted from tobacco. These new types of uses required fewer slaves, and many were sold from the Upper South in the domestic slave trade to the Deep South, where cotton cultivation expanded dramatically in the antebellum period.

During the twentieth century, Joe Thompson bought the Buckingham Mill.  In 1945 he put into place the long system of utilizing grain which used sifters as the grain was ground. Seven years later he added grain elevators. This was the last mill to make flour in Buckingham County and represents a time when America relied on the small farm and small business owner.

In the 21st century, large tracts of land are held by companies such as WestVaco, which sell pulpwood and other timber products to the paper mills and wood product producers.  It is still largely rural, with areas devoted to recreation such as fishing and hunting.  The County is home to families who can trace their ancestry to the early colonial history of Virginia.  Many families still live on tracts of land that were granted to their ancestors in that period. Some of the land grants were originally given to French Huguenots, who resettled from London, England in the southwestern part of the county in the early 1700s.

During the American Civil War, General Robert E. Lee's army marched through the county during his retreat on their way to surrender at Appomattox, Virginia. A marker in the cemetery of Trinity Presbyterian Church in New Canton reads,

According to the oral history of Trinity Presbyterian Church and this community, here are 45 Confederate and Union soldiers buried in mass graves directly behind this church. They left Appomattox after the surrender and headed for their homes north of here. Sick with disease, they died in a nearby camp. That they may not be forgotten, this plaque is placed by the Elliott Grays UDC Chapter #1877  2003.

In 2011, the county celebrated its 250th anniversary.

Geography

The geographic center of Virginia is located in Buckingham County, near the Mt. Rush community.

Adjacent counties
Fluvanna County - northeast
Cumberland County - east
Prince Edward County - south
Appomattox County - southwest
Nelson County - west
Albemarle County - northwest

Major highways

Demographics

2020 census

Note: the US Census treats Hispanic/Latino as an ethnic category. This table excludes Latinos from the racial categories and assigns them to a separate category. Hispanics/Latinos can be of any race.

2010 Census
As of the census of 2010, there were 17,146 people and 5,695 households residing in the county. The population density was 29.6 people per square mile (10/km2). There were 7,294 housing units . The racial makeup of the county was 62.5% White, 35.1% Black or African American alone, 0.3% American Indian, 0.4% Asian, 1.7% Hispanic or Latino, and 1.6% from two or more races.  60.9% of the population identified as White Alone, not Hispanic or Latino.

The largest ancestry groups are listed as 18.7% American, 9.2% English, and 5.4% German. People of African American descent comprise 35.1% of the population, usually having European ancestry as well.

There were 5,965 households, out of which 26.3% had children under the age of 18 living with them, 48.1% were married couples living together, 15.3% had a female householder with no husband present, 5.6 had a male householder with no wife present, and 31.1% were non-families. 26.1% of all households were made up of individuals living alone.  The average household size was 2.48 and the average family size was 2.95.

In the county, the population was spread out, with 19.2% under the age of 18, .6% from 20 to 24, 13% from 25 to 34, 22.8% from 35 to 49, and 22% from 50–64, and 14.3% who were 65 years of age or older.  There were 9,493 males and 7,653 females.  The median age was 41.7.

The median income for a household in the county was $36,378. Males had a median income of $36,420 versus $32,327 for females. The per capita income for the county was $16,938.  About 21.1% of the population were below the poverty line.

In education, 38.2% of the population over age 25 graduated high school (or equivalent), 13.9% had some college, no degree, 3.8% hold an associate degree, 10.9% hold a bachelor's degree, and 10.9% hold a Graduate or Professional degree.

Government

County Administration
County Administrator - Karl Carter
IT Director - Jamie Shumaker
Finance Director - Kevin Hickman
Zoning Coordinator - Nicci Edmonston

Board of Supervisors
District 1: Dennis Davis - 2023 Vice Chairman
District 2: Cameron Gilliam
District 3: Don Matthews  
District 4: Thomas Jordan Miles III 
District 5: Harry W. Bryant
District 6: Joe N. Chambers, Jr. -2023 Chairman 
District 7: Danny R. Allen

Constitutional officers
Clerk of the Circuit Court: Justin Midkiff
Commissioner of the Revenue: Stephanie Love (D)
Commonwealth's Attorney: Kemper Beasley
Sheriff: W.G. "Billy" Kidd, Jr. (I)
Treasurer: Christy L. Christian (D)
Chief of Police: None

State officials
Mark J. Peake (R) Virginia Senate
C. Matt Fariss (R) Virginia House of Delegates

Federal officials
Bob Good (R, VA-5) in the U.S. House of Representatives

Education
Buckingham County High School
Buckingham County Middle School
Buckingham County Primary School 
Buckingham Preschool
Central Virginia Christian School
Buckingham County Public Library

Communities

Town
Dillwyn

Census-designated places
Buckingham Courthouse (Buckingham)
Yogaville

Unincorporated communities
Arvonia
Mt. Rush
New Canton
Sprouses Corner
Union Hill
Glenmore

Notable residents 
Brigadier General William Lewis Cabell, Confederate States of America Brigadier General, and three term Mayor of Dallas, Texas.
John Wayles Eppes, United States Senator, Virginia; member, United States House of Representatives, Virginia; member, Virginia House of Delegates; son-in-law of U.S. President Thomas Jefferson.
Peter Francisco, American Revolutionary War hero.
Carter G. Woodson, historian, founder of Black History Month, "Father of Black History."
Clarice Taylor, American stage, film, and television actress.
Randolph Jefferson, younger brother of U.S. President Thomas Jefferson.
Satchidananda Saraswati (1922 – 2002), Indian spiritual teacher, helped bring yoga to America. 
Eugene Allen, Head Butler at the White House for 34 years.

See also
National Register of Historic Places listings in Buckingham County, Virginia

References

External links

The official website of Buckingham County, Virginia
Buckingham County Public Schools

 
Virginia counties
1761 establishments in Virginia
Counties on the James River (Virginia)
Populated places established in 1761